Matthew Thomas Overton (born July 6, 1985) is an American football long snapper for the Dallas Cowboys of the National Football League (NFL). He played college football at Western Washington after graduating from Diablo Valley College, and was signed as an undrafted free agent by the Seattle Seahawks in 2007. Overton has also played for the Indianapolis Colts, with whom he made the Pro Bowl in 2013.

In between stints with the Seahawks, Overton played for the Florida Tuskers of the United Football League in 2009. After his release from the Seahawks in 2010, he rejoined the UFL but as a member of the Omaha Nighthawks. In 2010, he was named to the UFL's top-10 players list, earning him the recognition as the league's top long snapper. Overton was protected by the Nighthawks for the 2011 season.

Early years
Overton attended Tracy High School in Tracy, California where he was a two-way starter for four years for the Bulldogs football team. He earned Lineman of the Year, player of the month, athlete of the month awards, and 2002 SJAA honorable mention honors. Despite these accolades, Overton was not offered any scholarships coming out of high school and opted to attend Diablo Valley College, a junior college in Pleasant Hill, California.

College career
Overton began his college football career at Diablo Valley College. In his time with DVC, Overton earned Special Teams MVP and Team Captain honors. He soon began to receive scholarship offers to 4-year institutions, and accepted an offer to attend Western Washington University. At Western Washington, he was a team captain and two-year starter at defensive end and long snapper. As the starting defensive end, he recorded over 40 tackles, 5 sacks, 7.5 tackles for loss, 1 interception, 1 forced fumble and 7 pass break-ups.

Professional career
Overton played for the Tri-Cities Fever of the af2 in 2008. He played for the Florida Tuskers of the United Football League in 2009 and helped them to an undefeated season and appeared in the first UFL championship. He was re-signed by the Seattle Seahawks on February 10, 2010. After being released by the Seahawks during training camp, he signed with the Omaha Nighthawks of the UFL for his second season. Overton was named to the UFL top-10 players list in 2010.

Indianapolis Colts

On April 3, 2012, Overton signed with the Indianapolis Colts. Used primarily as a long snapper, he was named to the Pro Bowl in 2013. On March 3, 2015, Overton signed a four-year extension with the Colts. The Colts released him on May 1, 2017.

Jacksonville Jaguars
Overton was signed by the Jacksonville Jaguars on August 3, 2017, after Carson Tinker suffered a torn ACL. On November 14, 2017, following the team's Week 10 win over the Los Angeles Chargers, Overton was placed on injured reserve with a dislocated shoulder.

On October 11, 2018, Overton was re-signed by the Jaguars after Carson Tinker suffered another knee injury.

On March 7, 2019, Overton re-signed with the Jaguars. He was released on September 1, 2019.

Los Angeles Chargers
On November 15, 2019, Overton was signed by the Los Angeles Chargers, but was released three days later.

Tennessee Titans
On October 12, 2020, Overton was signed to the Tennessee Titans practice squad. He was elevated to the active roster on November 7, November 12, and November 21 for the team's weeks 9, 10, and 11 games against the Chicago Bears, Indianapolis Colts, and Baltimore Ravens, and reverted to the practice squad after each game. On November 28, 2020, Overton was promoted to the active roster.

Los Angeles Chargers (second stint)
On August 16, 2021, Overton signed with the Los Angeles Chargers.

Los Angeles Rams
On September 13, 2022, Overton signed with the practice squad of the Los Angeles Rams. He was released on September 20.

Dallas Cowboys
On October 4, 2022, Overton signed with the Dallas Cowboys' practice squad. On October 15, 2022, Overton was promoted to the active roster.

NFL career statistics

Personal life
Overton is a Christian. He is married to Breanna Overton. They have one daughter together.

Overton runs his own youth charity foundation called Pros 2 Youth and owns and operates a small business with his former Nighthawks  teammates Maurice Clarett and Chad Lucas called Led By Pros. Led By Pros is located in Omaha, Nebraska and offers a youth football academy and helps young athletes to succeed in life and in sport.

References

External links
Jacksonville Jaguars bio
 Seattle Seahawks bio
 Western Washington Vikings bio

1985 births
Living people
People from San Leandro, California
People from Tracy, California
Players of American football from California
American football long snappers
American football defensive ends
American football linebackers
Western Washington Vikings football players
Seattle Seahawks players
Sportspeople from Alameda County, California
Tri-Cities Fever players
Florida Tuskers players
Omaha Nighthawks players
Indianapolis Colts players
Jacksonville Jaguars players
Los Angeles Chargers players
Tennessee Titans players
Los Angeles Rams players
Dallas Cowboys players
Unconferenced Pro Bowl players